The Organization of the Iranian Kurdistan Struggle, usually called Khabat (Kurdish for "struggle"), is an armed ethnic party of Kurds in Iran, currently exiled in northern Iraq. The group currently does cross-border attacks against Iranian forces.

History

Before establishment 
In 1979, a series of demonstrations against the monarchy took place in Iran, later known as the Iranian People's Revolution or the Islamic Revolution because all different ethnic groups of Iran participated in it. The result of this revolution was an Islamic republic. The beginning of the revolution in Kurdistan began in Mahabad, then Baneh, people marched and demonstrated against the Shah with different slogans, led by Sheikh Jalal Hosseini, especially after the funeral of Khan Ahmad Khani. Sheikh Jalal attacked the authorities of the Shah of Iran and called them tyrannical and spoke about the corruption and evils of this government to the people. They were able to defeat the Shah's authorities and establish several self-governing councils. After the victory of the revolution and the fall of the monarchy, Khomeini's return from Paris to Tehran and the formation of a provisional government headed by a businessman, The forces of East Kurdistan led by Sheikh Ezadin Hosseini visited the Supreme Leader of the Iranian Revolution, Ayatollah Ali Khamenei, to discuss Kurdish rights. However, the visit was unsuccessful because the newly elected authorities believed that this would lead to the division of Iran and therefore did not implement Sheikh Jalal's demands. Although they had expressed their support for Kurdistan's rights at the beginning of the revolution, they were against it after the victory of the revolution. The leaders of the Iranian revolution decided to hold a referendum to choose a new system of governance. The only question asked to the people was the monarchy or the Islamic Republic. Many people in Iran participated, but few Kurds because they believed that the referendum had no indication of granting Kurdish rights, especially Sheikh Ezzadin. In an Iranian newspaper, he announced that he would not participate in the referendum. Then other forces, especially the Democratic Party and Komala, encouraged the people not to participate. In the end, however, the referendum was successful and led to the establishment of an Islamic republic. Kurds being primarily Sunni Muslims were largely against the establishment of the Shia theocracy. Khomeini's forces accused Kurds of infidelity and separatism and attacked them.

A 3 month clash erupted between Kurds and Khomeini's forces. Khomeini appointed Sadeq Khalkhali as the legitimate ruler of Kurdistan and gave him all the powers. After that, Khalkhali went to Kurdistan and asked for help and support from Kurdish figures but was rejected. Khalkhali attacked Sheikh Jalal's family in Baneh and killed them. He also started killing and executing those who worked against the government. These led to the Qarne massacre, the Qalatan massacre and many other incidents.

Establishment 
Khabat Organization was established on August 27, 1980 by Sheikh Jalal with the help of several other religious teachers who supported the Kurdish-Islamic nationalism. This led to a new trend in the Iranian part of Kurdistan because there was no such organization with such ideology. Before the Khabat, all the other Kurdish parties were strongly leftist, which religious Kurds did not support. In 1980, the Khabat held its first congress in Baneh, called the founding congress. Sheikh Jalal Husseini was elected as the first person and secretary. In response to the establishment of the Khabat Organization, many people from Baneh and Sardasht became members of the organization. The Democratic Party and Komala Ka, the two main parties in East Kurdistan, considered the establishment of this organization unusual and believed that it was established to oppose them and obstruct their work. Although the Khabat Organization had stated that they were not formed to oppose these parties, but their main goal was to fight the regime forces and achieve Kurdish rights. They later fled to Iraqi Kurdistan due to the massive crackdown on Kurdish organizations by Iran. The Khabat does cross-border attacks from time to time on Iranian border guards.

Ideology 
The establishment of the Khabat Organization was a new event at that time and made it different from other organizations. Because before and during the Iranian Revolution, those who participated in the political and armed struggle in Iranian Kurdistan were mostly those who were nationalist, leftist and socialist in their political and ideological thinking, meaning that they were influenced by communist thought and leftist beliefs. In contrast, the Islamic Republic of Iran had twelve Shiite Imams, which was unacceptable to the Sunni Kurdish Muslims.  Therefore, the existence of an Islamic and nationalist organization was considered necessary. They believed that this was the way to achieve their rights and that secularism wouldn't achieve anything.

References

External links
Official website
Official website

Iranian Kurdish organisations
Kurdish political parties in Iran
Kurdish Islamism
National Council of Resistance of Iran
Organisations of the Iranian Revolution
Rebel groups in Iran
Organisations designated as terrorist by Iran
Kurdish Islamic organisations
Militant opposition to the Islamic Republic of Iran
1980 establishments in Iran